Scorzonera hispanica, commonly known as black salsify or Spanish salsify, also known as black oyster plant, serpent root, viper's herb, viper's grass or simply scorzonera, is a perennial member of the genus Scorzonera in the sunflower family (Asteraceae), cultivated as a root vegetable in the same way as purple salsify (Tragopogon porrifolius), also in the sunflower family. It is native to Southern Europe and cultivated as a crop in Southern and Central Europe. It grows on nutrient poor soils, dry pasture, rocky areas, in thickets and on limy or marly soils of temperate zones.

Description

Scorzonera hispanica is grown commercially as an annual, although it is a biennial plant. After a vegetative phase in the first year, the plant flowers in its second year and can reach a height of 60cm with a stem diameter of 5 cm. The hermaphroditic flowers are insect-pollinated. The flower-head is terminal and consists of yellow ray florets. The stem is smooth and leafy and the leaves are lanceolate to ovate with entire margins. Black salsify forms a long cylindrical taproot with a brownish to black cork layer. If harvested young, the carrot-like roots are tender, long and tapered with shiny white flesh. They contain a milky latex, which turns the roots black when exposed to air.

History

Black salsify is native to Southern Europe and the Near East. As is indicated by its binomial name, it is generally thought to have spread to the rest of Europe from Spain, but the first mention of the vegetable by a Western writer came from Rudolf Leonhard, who reported seeing scorzonera at the market of Aleppo in Syria, in 1575. It is often claimed that the name of the genus Scorzonera derives from the Old French word scorzon meaning snake (or "adder" to be exact), which seems likely given a widespread belief that the plant makes a good antidote against bites of venomous snakes. Alternatively, the name could be derived from the Italian "scorza negra" meaning "black bark"/"black peel" and indicating the dark brown to black skin of the root. The Celtic and Germanic peoples are believed to have eaten the black salsify, which was considered efficacious against the bubonic plague and snake bites until the 16th century. The plant was being cultivated as a vegetable in Italy and France by 1660 and, soon after, vast fields were grown of it in what is now Belgium.

Nutritional value

The black salsify is considered nutritious: it contains proteins, fats, asparagine, choline, laevulin, as well as minerals such as potassium, calcium, phosphorus, iron, sodium, and vitamins A, B1, E and C. It also contains the polysaccharide inulin, conferring a mild sweetness that is suitable for diabetics. Inulin, used as a dietary fibre, may have a positive effect on the digestive system, blood circulation, kidneys and inhibit cancerous processes.

Preparation

Various parts of the Black Salsify plant can be consumed, including roots, leafy shoots, and open flowers, either cooked or raw. The principal product however are the stem tuber roots.
The thick black skin of the salsify root is usually considered inedible and can be removed either prior to or after boiling. If the skin is removed prior to boiling, the peeled root should be immediately immersed in water mixed with vinegar or lemon juice, in order to prevent discolouring. Since the root contains an extremely sticky latex, it is often more convenient to peel it after boiling the root for 20 to 25 minutes (or less). Residue of the latex can be removed by rubbing with a drop of oil and then washing with soap.

Black salsify is often eaten together with other vegetables, such as peas and carrots. But it is also popular served like asparagus in a white sauce, such as bechamel sauce, mustard sauce or hollandaise sauce. Boiled salsify roots may also be coated with batter and deep fried.
The young roots are used in salads and the salsify latex can be used as chewing gum. Flowering shoots are consumed similarly to asparagus and the flowers can be added to salads, together with brown seedlings or the long clumps of grass-like green leaves.

The scorzonera sweet is a crystallized dessert made from scorzonera in Évora, Alentejo, Portugal. It is listed on the Ark of Taste.

Cultivation

Black salsify is hitherto mainly a European crop. Belgium, France and the Netherlands are the world's largest producers of black salsify; significant amounts are also produced in Germany. In the latter country, 'Hoffmanns Schwarzer Pfahl' is a cultivar widely used by commercial growers, while 'Duplex' is popular among small-scale gardeners. Some other cultivars are commercially available, but because it was a rather localized crop before being produced for a wider market there are comparatively few landraces. Collections of local races and old cultivars can be found at the Nordic Genetic Resource Center in Sweden and the Vavilov Institute of Plant-Genetic Resources in Russia.

Cultivars 

Black salsify cultivars differ in taste, size, region of origin and harvest time. The following table shows some popular examples.

Breeding objectives are reduced susceptibility to bolting, low percentage of roots with cavities, improved suitability for mechanical sowing and harvesting, as well as for industrial processing.

Sowing 

Scorzonera is sown in early spring, preferably at the end of April. Sowing too early can result in early flowering and loss of yield. About 12kg of seeds per hectare are required. The seeds are sown directly into shallow furrows at a depth of 1.5 - 2cm with 30-50cm in between them. Plants should stand at a density of 50 plants/m2 for optimal yield. Because of the seeds’ unusual shape, machine sowing is difficult. Storage of seeds is also a critical point, as germination is usually only guaranteed for 1-2 years. Optimal storage conditions are dry and cool.

Soil requirements 

The roots develop best in very light textured, sandy soil. Any stones or gravel in the ground can cause root deformation. Ideal pH values are between 5.8 – 6.5 and liming is recommended for more acidic soils. A high humus content is beneficial. Generally, the species can grow in a variety of conditions and has potential to be grown as a cash crop in less favorable, marginal environments in temperate zones.

Harvesting and post-harvest treatment 

Harvesting takes place from November to March, with the optimum time for high quality being end of December. The process is somewhat complicated, as the roots are quite fragile, and broken material loses its freshness. Entire roots will keep fresh all winter if stored in a cool dark place, due to their robust black corky skin. In root cellars they may keep fresh well into springtime. The roots can also be washed, peeled, cut and then frozen. In supermarkets, they can be bought conserved in glass or canned. On farmer’s markets, the roots are sold unwashed to secure quality and freshness. Black salsify is, however, very hardy and frost-resistant and will grow well in most cool-temperate climates and usually yield 15–20 tonnes of roots per hectare. In British gardens it is common to profit from its perennial character by leaving it in the ground until its roots have grown to sufficient size for harvesting; this can take two years. Commercially, it can be grown best as the year's second crop. It is recommended to have three to four years in the crop rotation before the cultivation of other Asteraceae.

Pests and diseases

Pests 
 Carrot rust fly (Psila rosae): The larvae or maggots of the carrot rust fly eat the plant roots and entrench themselves in the roots. Psila thereby inhibits plant growth and facilitates infection by soft-rot bacteria. Generally root crops are popular for the carrot rust fly.
 Wireworms (Selatosomus destructor and Ctenicera pruinina): The wireworms are the larvae of click beetles, which remain in the larval stage for between 2-5 years. They live in the soil and feed on roots. The wireworms cause a lot of damage when they bore directly into the roots. Plant pathogens can gain access through this, which can lead to rotting of the roots. Root rot can lead to wilting, stunting and deformation of the seedlings and eventually to death.
 Root knot nematode (Meloidogyne incognita, M. javanica, M. hapla and M. arenaria): Can cause great damage to the roots of salsify. Nematode activity damages growing root tips, causing branching, distortion, stunting and deformation of the taproot. The result can be general stunting, wilting and leaf chlorosis (yellowing) above ground.

Diseases 
 Bacterial soft rot (Bacillus carotovorus Jones): The bacteria eat the root core. This can be recognised by a soft, watery and slimy root rot. This in turn facilitates infection by vertical fungi or bacteria. The ideal temperature for bacterial soft rot is 21°C - 27°C, but it can survive and cause damage at temperatures between 0°C - 32°C. For this reason, the air must be properly ventilated when storing and transporting the crop in tropical and warm environments.
 White blister (Albugo species): a leaf disease that favours wet weather. It is related to the pathogens of downy mildew and the two can also occur together. White blisters form blister-like white pustules on the underside of the leaves. A purple pigmentation is visible around the affected areas. This reduces plant growth and heavily infested plant parts may shrivel or even die.

References

Cichorieae
Flora of Europe
Root vegetables
Plants described in 1753
Taxa named by Carl Linnaeus